Euroschinus falcatus (sometimes spelled Euroschinus falcata) is a species of tree in the family Anacardiaceae. Common names include pink poplar, ribbonwood, maiden's blush, and blush cudgerie. It is an endemic Australian species, ranging from Jervis Bay (35° S), NSW to Cooktown (15° S), North Queensland. Its natural habitats are littoral, riverine, and dry subtropical rainforests. Maximum height is 45 metres.

Gallery

References

External links

falcatus
Sapindales of Australia
Flora of New South Wales
Flora of Queensland
Trees of Australia
Taxa named by Joseph Dalton Hooker